Anayeh (also Romanized as ‘Anāyeh) is a village in Miyan Ab Rural District, in the Central District of Shushtar County, Khuzestan Province, Iran. At the 2006 census, its population was 63, in 10 families.

References 

Populated places in Shushtar County